Coleraine Borough Council was a local council mainly in County Londonderry and partly in County Antrim in Northern Ireland. It merged with Ballymoney Borough Council, Limavady Borough Council and Moyle District Council in May 2015 under local government reorganisation in Northern Ireland to become Causeway Coast and Glens District Council

Its headquarters were in the town of Coleraine. Small towns in the area include Garvagh, Portrush, Portstewart and Kilrea.

Coleraine Borough Council consisted of four electoral areas: Coleraine East, Coleraine Central, The Skerries and Bann. The council last had 22 members from the following political parties: 8 Democratic Unionist Party (DUP), 6 Ulster Unionist Party (UUP), 3 Social Democratic and Labour Party (SDLP), 2 Alliance Party 1 Sinn Féin and 2 Independent. Unionist-controlled Coleraine Borough Council operated a rotation for positions of Mayor and Deputy Mayor between the UUP, DUP and the Irish nationalist SDLP. The last election was due to take place in May 2009, but on 25 April 2008, Shaun Woodward, Secretary of State for Northern Ireland announced that the scheduled 2009 district council elections were to be postponed until the introduction of the eleven new councils in 2011. The proposed reforms were abandoned in 2010, and the most recent district council elections took place in 2011

The borough council area, together with the neighbouring district of Limavady and part of Derry City Council, formed the East Londonderry constituency for elections to the Westminster Parliament and Northern Ireland Assembly.

Mayor of Coleraine
Source: Freedom of Information request to Coleraine Borough Council

* For 2015 onwards see Causeway Coast and Glens District Council

Population
The area covered by Coleraine Borough Council had a population of 79,067 residents according to the 2011 Northern Ireland census.

See also
 Local Councils in Northern Ireland

References

Politics of County Londonderry
Politics of County Antrim
Coleraine
District councils of Northern Ireland, 1973–2015
Boroughs of Northern Ireland